Christoph Ingenhoven (born 8 March 1960) is a German architect. He established his architecture practice ingenhoven associates in Düsseldorf in 1985. His major works include Lufthansa HQ in Frankfurt (2006),. 1 Bligh in Sydney (2011), Marina One in Singapore (2017), Toranomon Hills Towers in Tokyo (2022) and Stuttgart Main Station (2010-)

Career 
Christoph Ingenhoven was born in Düsseldorf in 1960 and studied architecture at the RWTH Aachen from 1978 to 1984 and from 1980 to 1981 at the Kunstakademie Düsseldorf with Hans Hollein. In 1985 Christoph Ingenhoven became self-employed. Today, his architecture office operates under the name ingenhoven associates and has its headquarters in Düsseldorf.

His architecture office received international recognition in 1997 with the design of one of the world's first ecological high-rise buildings, the RWE Tower in Essen. Before, in 1991, the then 31-year-old Ingenhoven received a great deal of attention when he and his team competed in the international competition for the Commerzbank Tower in Frankfurt and shared jury prize with Norman Foster. The fact that Foster was commissioned to build the skyscraper prompted Frei Otto to make a public statement in which he spoke out in favor of the young German architect's design.

Christoph Ingenhoven is founding memeber of the German Sustainable Building Council (DGNB) and the Bundesstiftung Baukultur, a federal foundation for architectural culture in Germany. He is member of the International Academy of Architecture.

Style and philosophy 

Christoph Ingenhoven pursues an approach to sustainable architecture that strives for the highest ecological, architectural and artistic goals. The structural designs provide for the use of natural resources such as sunlight, geothermal energy, rainwater and air conditioning through natural ventilation and are adapted to the surrounding (urban) landscape as site-specifically as possible. Ingenhoven calls his concept of holistic, interdisciplinary, sustainable architecture supergreen. In addition to the ecological aspects, the supergreen concept also includes social and humanistic aspects.

Awards and honours 

Christoph Ingenhoven's works received numerous national and international awards and recognitions, including the Holcim Awards for Sustainable Construction Gold for Stuttgart Main Station and the International High-Rise Award for 1 Bligh in Sydney. His projects have received several MIPIM awards, most recently the Lanserhof Sylt in 2023 in the category Best Hospitality, Tourism and Leisure.

Christoph Ingenhoven was recipient of Europe's highest architecture award in 2022, the European Prize for Architecture. The Saxon Academy of Arts honored Ingenhoven with the Gottfried Semper Prize 2019. The German structural engineer and architect Werner Sobek delivered the laudatory speech at the award ceremony in Dresden.

Memberships 

 International Academy of Architecture, UNESCO
 Bundesstiftung Baukultur (founding member)
 German Sustainable Building Council DGNB (founding member) 
 Council on Tall Buildings and Urban Habitat (CTBUH)
 North Rhine-Westphalia Academy for Science and Arts
 Association of German Architects (BDA)
 American Institute of Architects (AIA)
 Royal Institute of British Architects (RIBA)
 Swiss Society of Engineers and Architects (SIA)
 Australian Institute of Architects
 North Rhine-Westphalia Association of Architects (AKNW)

Projects (selection)

Completed buildings 

 1997: RWE-Tower, Essen
 1999–2001: Audi Pavillon for trade fairs in Franfurt, Tokyo, Detroit and Paris
 2005: Uptown (O2-Tower) Munich
 2005: Peek & Cloppenburg Lübeck
 2006: Lufthansa Aviation Center Frankfurt
 2008: European Investment Bank Luxembourg
 2008: Breeze Tower Osaka
 2008: New Trade Fair Hamburg
 2009: Sky Office Düsseldorf
 2011: 1 Bligh Street, Sydney
 2010: Swarovski HQ at Lake Zurich
 2011: HDI Gerling HQ, Hannover
 2014: Lanserhof Lake Tegern
 2015: Institute of Mathematics at Karlsruhe Institute of Technology
 2017: Town Hall Freiburg
 2017: Marina One Singapur
 2019: Oeconomicum Heinrich Heine University Düsseldorf
 2021: Kö-Bogen II Düsseldorf
 2021: Renovation Düsseldorfer Schauspielhaus
 2022: Toranomon Hills Towers Tokyo
 2022: Lanserhof Sylt

Ongoing work 

 Stuttgart Main Station
 Dom-Hotel Cologne 
 Hotel Arlberg Hospiz in St. Christoph, Austria
 Pier One Düsseldorf
 High-rise 505 George Street in Sydney
 Am Oberwiesenfeld in Munich
 Plange Mühle Campus Düsseldorf
 The Crown, Strandkai HafenCity Hamburg
 Kant & Kopf HafenCity Hamburg
 UNIQ Towers Düsseldorf
 1 Spring Street Melbourne
 Klinik Gut St. Moritz
 Heinrich Hertz Tower Hamburg

Competitions and studies 

 1991: Commerzbank HQ Frankfurt
 2000: Airbus Hamburg
 2001: Central Park Berlin
 2007: UCD University College Dublin (1st Prize)
 2008: Bologna Central Station
 2008: ICC International Criminal Court The Hague (1st Prize)
 2010: Google Headquarters Mountain View

Bibliography 

 a+u 2015:08 (539) Feature: ingenhoven architects - supergreen 
 Ingenhoven, Christoph (2022). Stadt neu denken - Es liegt an uns zu handeln! In: Brunnengräber, Achim: Das Zeitalter der Städte (in German). Jahrbuch Ökologie. Hirzel. ISBN 978-3-7776-3032-8 
 Ingenhoven, Christoph (2019). Arbeiten am Raumschiff Erde oder: Die grüne Agora. In: Weibel, Peter: "Von Morgenröten, die noch nicht geleuchtet haben" (in German). Suhrkamp. ISBN 978-3-518-46943-9 
 Ingenhoven, Christoph/Altenschmidt, Stefan/Lambertz, Michaela/Mösle, Peter (2018): Praxishandbuch Green Building (in German). De Gruyter. ISBN 978-3-11-027517-9 
 Feireis, Kristin (2002). Energies (in German). Birkhäuser. ISBN 3-7643-6667-2
 Ingenhoven, Christoph and Pehnt, Wolfgang (2000). Ingenhoven, Overdiek und Partner 1991-1999. Birkhäuser. ISBN 3-7643-5839-4

External links 
ingenhoven associates

Christoph Ingenhoven shows his office in Düsseldorf 

Christoph Ingenhoven at CTBUH 

Christoph Ingenhoven at world-architects.com

Interview in Hills Life Magazine

lecture at Architects not Architecture

lecture at ZKM in Karlsruhe 

lecture at Oskar von Miller Forum (Deutsches Museum)

References 

  

1960 births
Living people
Architects